Saginaw Township Community Schools (STCS) is a school district in Saginaw Township, located in Saginaw County, just west of the city of Saginaw, Michigan in the United States.

The district, a part of the Saginaw Intermediate School District, provides public education to approximately 4,700 students, focusing on grades Kindergarten to 12th, but also offers services to pre-K students. The district's Community Education department also provides learning opportunities to adults and children of various age, regardless of residency within the township.

Schools

Arrowwood Elementary 
Arrowwood is the larger of two traditional elementary schools that provide education to Saginaw Township students in 3rd, 4th, and 5th grades. The school also provides a variety of programs for students with special needs.

The school is housed on the campus which was used for one the district's middle schools prior to the opening of White Pine Middle School in 1988. Its previous location was demolished in the 1990s due to asbestos and rezoned as residential property.

Hemmeter Elementary 
Hemmeter is a magnet school for gifted and talented kindergarten through 5th grade students. Students from all elementary schools throughout Saginaw Township are eligible to participate in the Magnate program. The academic program includes accelerated core content, as well as music, art, and physical education.  Student activities offered include Destination Imagination, fine and performing arts including strings education, accelerated reading, Science Plus Art Reaching Kids (SPARK), Hartley Outdoor Education Center, and special days designed to enrich the curriculum.

Sherwood Elementary 
Sherwood is the larger of two traditional elementary schools that provide education to Saginaw Township students in Kindergarten, 1st, and 2nd grades. The school also provides a variety of programs for students with special needs.  It also has a swimming pool on campus, used for the district's Community Education swim programs. 

The school is housed on the campus which was used for one the district's middle school prior to the opening of White Pine Middle School in 1988. Its previous location, across the street from what is now Heritage High School, was demolished in the 1990s due to asbestos and rezoned as a commercial property.

Weiss Elementary 
Weiss provides a comprehensive educational program for approximately 300 students in 3rd, 4th, and 5th grades. Curriculum includes traditional core content, as well as physical education, music, Spanish, and art.

Westdale Elementary 
Westdale provides a comprehensive educational program for approximately 300 students in Young Fives, Kindergarten, 1st, and 2nd grades. Curriculum includes traditional core content, as well as physical education, music, Spanish, and art.

White Pine Middle School 
White Pine serves as the district's middle school, providing traditional, gifted/talented, and special education to Saginaw Township students in 6th, 7th, and 8th grades.  The school uses Learning Communities to focus educational needs.  Students are encouraged to explore several program opportunities such as two foreign languages and a fine and performing arts program that includes traditional art, industrial arts, orchestra, band, drama.  White Pine also offers a variety of extracurricular activities including a wide variety of sports such as swimming, basketball, volleyball, cheerleading, softball, pompoms, football, and soccer, as well as Destination Imagination, Youth in Government, and Middle School Math Competitions.

The school's campus was previously used by Douglas MacArthur High School until Heritage High School was established in 1988. Prior to its establishment, the district was served by two middle schools, which are now used by Sherwood and Arrowwood.

Heritage High School 

Heritage has a student body of 1600–1800 students. Ninth through twelfth grade Saginaw Township students are offered traditional, accelerated, and special needs education. The school offers a range of Advanced Placement classes including, but not limited to Biology, Physics 1, Physics 2, Chemistry, Environmental Science, Computer Science Principles, Computer Science A, U.S. Government & Politics, U.S. History, European History, Calculus AB, Calculus BC, Statistics, Spanish V, French V, English Literature and Composition, and English Language and Composition.

Core courses are enhanced with a range of art, industrial art, instrumental and vocal music, drama, business, leadership, and technology.  In addition to approximately 50 athletics programs, Heritage also offers about 30 other clubs and extracurricular activities to students.

Heritage was the product of a 1988–89 merger between two former Saginaw Township high schools, Douglas MacArthur High School and Dwight D. Eisenhower High School. The new "Heritage Hawks" utilizes the old Eisenhower campus and selected one color from each of its parent schools; its official colors are now navy blue and Kelly green. The original logo of the Heritage Hawks had a hawk above HH with a chain looping down around the HH. The chain links were 8s—signifying the year the new school was established: 1988.

Mackinaw High School 
Providing an alternative High School Completion program, Mackinaw's curriculum is geared toward success in the Certificate Programs at nearby Delta College.  Mackinaw is open to all students in the county ages 14–19 who have struggled with traditional high school (attendance, motivation problems) or who have dropped out of school and are looking for a second chance to earn a high school diploma.  The school's flexible schedule can students achieve progress based upon proficiencies and their own motivation to succeed.

Former schools 

Plainfield was an elementary school within the district which was closed in 2011. The school's campus is now used for Mackinaw High School.

Douglas MacArthur High School and Dwight D. Eisenhower High School were merged in 1988 to create Heritage High School. The Eisenhower campus went on to be used by the new high school, while the MacArthur campus became home to White Pine Middle School.

References

External links 
 Saginaw Township Community Schools

School districts in Michigan
Saginaw Intermediate School District